Setodyschirius is a genus of beetles in the family Carabidae, containing the following species:

 Setodyschirius jabiru Bulirsch, 2011
 Setodyschirius kangaroo Bulirsch, 2011
 Setodyschirius macleayi (Sloane, 1896)
 Setodyschirius mastersii (W. J. Macleay, 1866)
 Setodyschirius monteithianus Bulirsch, 2011
 Setodyschirius ovensensis (Blackburn, 1891)
 Setodyschirius pseudozonatus Bulirsch, 2011
 Setodyschirius stephensii (W. J. Macleay, 1865)
 Setodyschirius storeyi Bulirsch, 2011
 Setodyschirius torrensensis (Blackburn, 1890)
 Setodyschirius weiri Bulirsch, 2011
 Setodyschirius wilsoni (Sloane, 1923)
 Setodyschirius zonatus (Putzeys, 1868)

References

Scaritinae